Veli Veikko Valtteri Lehtelä (6 September 1935 – 3 June 2020) was a Finnish rower. He competed in various two-man and four man events at the 1956, 1960 and 1964 Olympics and won two bronze medals, in 1956 and 1960. His son Jorma Lehtelä also became an Olympic rower.

Throughout most of his career Lehtelä rowed with Toimi Pitkänen. Besides two Olympic bronze medals, they won two gold and two silver medals at the European championships from 1955 to 1961, and  placed sixth at the 1964 Olympics.

References

1935 births
2020 deaths
Finnish male rowers
Olympic rowers of Finland
Rowers at the 1956 Summer Olympics
Rowers at the 1960 Summer Olympics
Rowers at the 1964 Summer Olympics
Olympic bronze medalists for Finland
Olympic medalists in rowing
Medalists at the 1960 Summer Olympics
Medalists at the 1956 Summer Olympics
European Rowing Championships medalists
People from Valkeakoski
Sportspeople from Pirkanmaa